Suddaby is a surname. Notable people with the surname include:

 Elsie Suddaby (1893–1980), British lyric soprano
 Glenn T. Suddaby (born 1956), American judge
 Peter Suddaby (born 1947), English footballer
 Rowland Suddaby (1912–1972), British artist and illustrator